"Why" is a song written by Rodney Clawson, Vicky McGehee, and Big & Rich's John Rich and recorded by American country music artist Jason Aldean. It was released in November 2005 as the second single from Aldean’s 2005 self-titled debut album. The song became Aldean's first number one hit on the U.S. Billboard Hot Country Songs chart.

Content
A ballad backed by electric guitar, the song centralizes on the male character who has finally come to the realization that he has caused his lover emotional pain. He then asks himself why he lets himself treat her wrongly, and why he takes so long to show his feelings for her.

Critical reception
Kevin John Coyne of Country Universe gave the song a positive review, saying that it is "interesting" and sounds "very real and sincere".

Music video
The music video was directed by Wes Edwards. It premiered in the week of November 14, 2005.

Chart performance
"Why" debuted at number 49 on the U.S. Billboard Hot Country Songs for the week of December 3, 2005.  As of April 2015, the song has sold 675,000 digital copies in the United States.

Year-end charts

Other versions
Country music singer Shannon Brown recorded the song for her 2006 album Corn Fed.

References

2005 singles
2005 songs
Country ballads
2000s ballads
Jason Aldean songs
Songs written by John Rich
Songs written by Rodney Clawson
Songs written by Vicky McGehee
Song recordings produced by Michael Knox (record producer)
Music videos directed by Wes Edwards
BBR Music Group singles